David John Arkin (born October 7, 1987) is a former American football offensive guard in the National Football League for the Dallas Cowboys, Miami Dolphins, Seattle Seahawks, Indianapolis Colts and Los Angeles Rams. He played college football at Missouri State University.

Early years
Arkin attended Kapaun Mt. Carmel High School. He became a starter as a sophomore. As a senior, he was a consensus All-state selection as an offensive lineman. As a defensive lineman, he earned All-city consideration, registering 47 tackles and 3 sacks, while helping his team to a sectional championship. He started 28 games in his last three seasons. He also was part of the school's wrestling team.

He accepted a football scholarship from Missouri State University. He was the team starter at right guard in his first three years. He started playing left tackle in the last two games of his junior season and was named the full-time starter at that position as a senior.

He received All-MVFC honors in four straight years, becoming the third Missouri State player ever to achieve that distinction.

Professional career

Dallas Cowboys
Arkin was selected by the Dallas Cowboys in the fourth round (110th overall) in the 2011 NFL Draft, with the intention of playing him at offensive guard. He was declared inactive for every game as a rookie.

In 2012, he was forced to learn the center position in training camp, after the team suffered a series of injuries. His lack of strength and experience, kept him inactive in 9 games. He was active for 7 contests, although he didn't play a snap despite being healthy.

In 2013, the team decided to have him focus on the right guard position. As he has done in previous training camps, he proved to be one of the most durable players on the team and was activated for the first regular season game of his career in the season opener against the New York Giants. He was released on October 26, to make room for Jakar Hamilton and later signed to the team's practice squad.

Miami Dolphins
On November 5, 2013, he was signed by the Miami Dolphins from the Dallas Cowboys practice squad. The signing was a direct result of the issues the Dolphins where having on their offensive line, after Richie Incognito alleged role in the harassment of teammate Jonathan Martin. He was active in only one game (against the Carolina Panthers). The following season after being tried at center, he was waived on August 30, 2014.

Seattle Seahawks
On September 3, 2014, the Seattle Seahawks signed him to their practice squad. He was waived five days later.

Indianapolis Colts
On September 16, 2014, Arkin was signed to the Indianapolis Colts practice squad. On December 31, he was promoted to the active roster when Gosder Cherilus was placed on the injured reserve list. He played in 3 playoff games, mainly on special teams.

On September 5, 2015, he was released and signed to the practice squad. He was cut from the practice squad on September 23, and re-signed on October 26. On November 3, he was released to make room for guard Ben Heenan.

St. Louis / Los Angeles Rams
On November 17, 2015, Arkin was signed to the St. Louis Rams practice squad. On September 6, 2016, he was released and signed to the Rams' practice squad two days later. He was promoted to the active roster on December 15. He appeared in 2 games as a backup offensive guard. He was released by the Rams on May 1, 2017.

References

External links
Missouri State Bears

1987 births
Living people
Players of American football from Wichita, Kansas
American football offensive tackles
American football offensive guards
Missouri State Bears football players
Dallas Cowboys players
Miami Dolphins players
Indianapolis Colts players
Los Angeles Rams players
Seattle Seahawks players